Marjorie Hood was an All-American Girls Professional Baseball League player.

According to All American League data, Hood, a native of Bell Buckle, Tennessee, played at outfield for the Rockford Peaches and South Bend Blue Sox clubs in the 1943 season. Additional information is incomplete because there are no records available at the time of the request.

The All-American Girls Professional Baseball League folded in 1954, but there is a permanent display at the Baseball Hall of Fame and Museum at Cooperstown, New York since 1988 that honors the entire league rather than any individual figure.

Sources

All-American Girls Professional Baseball League players
Rockford Peaches players
South Bend Blue Sox players
Baseball players from Tennessee
People from Bell Buckle, Tennessee
Date of birth missing
Possibly living people
Year of birth missing